St Mark's Catholic School is a co-educational Catholic secondary school and sixth form with academy status, having formerly been a voluntary aided school, situated in Hounslow, West London, England.

History
In 1936, Father Wilfred Musgrave, Parish Priest of Sts Michael and Martin's Church, suggested that a mixed Catholic secondary school should be built in Hounslow. His plan was suspended by the outbreak of the Second World War, but in 1952, a site was purchased at 106 Bath Road with a house, land, and an orchard.

Musgrave died in 1955 and the project was transferred to his successor, Canon John Mackenzie. Building work commenced in 1958, funded by donations from local Catholics.

The school, initially called Archbishop Myers Secondary, received its first 279 pupils on 10 May 1960, welcomed by Headteacher Patrick Boland and 11 staff. The builders remained until April 1961 and the School was officially opened in March 1962.

In 1972, the school became a voluntary aided school and changed its name to St Mark's. The uniform changed from maroon to navy blue. Originally six forms of entry were planned with a split site – a Senior School located at the other end of Hounslow High Street. These plans were dropped and in 1978 the buildings of the old SS Michael and Martin's Primary School were included in the enlarged St Mark's site. The original Parish Church dating from 1886 became a Sixth Form Common Room.

Patrick Boland retired in 1978 and was replaced by Patrick Topp. St Mark's contained 800 pupils and 50 teachers. Topp was succeeded by David Sheath in 1986. By the time of Sheath's retirement the School was recognised as one of the best in the London area. Paul Enright took over in 2001, and was succeeded in 2018 by Andrea Waugh-Lucas. The school has more than 1,200 students.

Curriculum

When pupils start at St Mark's they are assigned to mixed ability tutor groups. They remain in the same tutor group until they finish Year 11. The school uses a combination of setting and mixed ability teaching to deliver the curriculum. This gives pupils the best chance to achieve their full potential. Classes are set in Mathematics from Year 7, Languages from Year 8 and there is some broad banding in Science from the end of Year 9.

Class sizes are reduced in a number of subjects in Year 7 to aid teaching and learning. This means there are six tutor groups but these are often divided into eight teaching groups.

At Key Stage 3, pupils at St Mark's follow a wide curriculum: Religious Education, English, Mathematics, Science, Geography, History, ICT, Technology, Music, Drama, Art, Physical Education, PSHCE, Modern Foreign Languages and Learning for Learning.

At Key Stage 4 all pupils study Religious Education, English, English Literature, Physical Education (core), Mathematics, Science, whether separate or combined, PSHCE and a Technology-based subject.  The vast majority continue with a Modern Foreign Language and pupils can choose from ICT, Art, Business Studies, Drama, Geography, History, Physical Education, ASDAN, Child Development and Music.

There are a number of alternative pathways for a limited number of pupils linked to attendance at college for part of the week. These include construction, hair and beauty, food, sports management and mechanics. Staff use a variety of teaching methods so that pupils can develop a range of learning styles. Lessons are differentiated and carefully planned to cater for the needs of all pupils. The school is well equipped with the latest ICT facilities including a wireless network, laptops, thirteen computer suites, a recording studio and interactive whiteboards.

Sixth form

The School offers a wide range of over 25 subjects at AS and A level: Art, Biology, Business Studies, Chemistry, Classical Civilisations, Critical Thinking, Drama, English Literature, Economics, Film Studies, French, German, Government and Politics, Geography, History, ICT, Mathematics, Further Mathematics, Media Studies, Music, Physics, Product Design, Psychology, Religious Education, Sociology, Sports Studies, Textiles.  In addition the School offers a two-year vocational course.  Through the Catholic Consortium links with Gumley House School and Gunnersbury School, the School is able to offer students an even wider range of combinations of subjects.

Extracurricular activities

Students' education at St Mark's is enriched by a wide range of activities occurring both after school and during lunchtime. These change with the time of year and the particular interests of staff and pupils.

Field trips, visits abroad, visits to the theatre and museums, and Year Group outings are established parts of the extra-curricular life of the school. Regular extra-curricular sporting activities include basketball, badminton, football, athletics, cricket, rugby, tennis, hockey and netball.

Notable former pupils
Elvis Costello – Songwriter and musician.
Denys Baptiste – Award-winning saxophonist.
Tim Don – World Triathlon Champion and Olympian.
Dean Gaffney – Actor
Graham Stack – Retired professional footballer 
Michael Mancienne – Professional footballer (New England Revolution).
Rajiv Ouseph – Badminton player

References

Catholic secondary schools in the Archdiocese of Westminster
Secondary schools in the London Borough of Hounslow
Educational institutions established in 1960
1960 establishments in England
Academies in the London Borough of Hounslow